Amedei is an artisan chocolate manufacturing company located in Pontedera in the Tuscany region of Italy, considered to be one of the finest chocolate producers in the world. Their products range from chocolate bars to truffles and pralines. Their award-winning chocolate bars use single-origin and single varietal cocoa beans. One of their products, Amedei Porcelana, is known as the world's most expensive chocolate.
They obtain the cocoa from a Venezuelan region called Chuao; it has been awarded, with the Gold in the category Best Bean to Bar in 2005 and in 2006 by the Academy of Chocolate, although every year this association elects a new chocolate as the best one, being this only a one-year lasting award.

See also

 List of bean-to-bar chocolate manufacturers

References

External links
 Amedei

Italian brands
Italian chocolate companies
Companies based in Tuscany
Italian  companies established in 1990